Rineloricaria platyura is a species of catfish in the family Loricariidae. It is native to South America, where it occurs in coastal rivers from the mouth of the Amazon River to the Essequibo River in French Guiana, Guyana, and Brazil. The species reaches 14 cm (5.5 inches) in standard length and is believed to be a facultative air-breather.

Rineloricaria platyura sometimes appears in the aquarium trade, where it is frequently referred to as the pearlscale whiptail or the Amazonia whiptail.

References 

Loricariidae
Fish described in 1849
Catfish of South America
Fish of French Guiana
Fish of Guyana
Freshwater fish of Brazil